Julius Kühn (born 1 April 1993) is a German handball player for MT Melsungen and the German national team.

Achievements
Summer Olympics:
: 2016
European Championship:
: 2016

References

External links

1993 births
Living people
German male handball players
Sportspeople from Duisburg
Olympic handball players of Germany
Handball players at the 2016 Summer Olympics
Medalists at the 2016 Summer Olympics
Olympic bronze medalists for Germany
Olympic medalists in handball
Handball-Bundesliga players
VfL Gummersbach players
MT Melsungen players
Handball players at the 2020 Summer Olympics
21st-century German people